Roland Godin (11 October 1926 – 22 June 2009) was a Ralliement créditiste and Social Credit party member of the House of Commons of Canada. He was a manager by career.

Godin was born in Neuville, Quebec. He was first elected to Parliament at the Portneuf riding in the 1965 general election and re-elected in the 1968 and 1972. From 1966 to 1971, his party was known as the Ralliement créditiste. Godin was defeated in the 1974 federal election by Pierre Bussières of the Liberal party.

He ran for the Ralliement créditiste du Québec in the 1976 provincial election and finished fourth against Liberal incumbent Michel Pagé in Portneuf.

Godin died at Donnacona, Quebec on 22 June 2009.

References

External links
 

1926 births
2009 deaths
Members of the House of Commons of Canada from Quebec
Social Credit Party of Canada MPs